Akseli Roine (11 March 1896 – 26 January 1944) was a Finnish gymnast. He competed in nine events at the 1924 Summer Olympics.

References

External links
 

1896 births
1944 deaths
Finnish male artistic gymnasts
Olympic gymnasts of Finland
Gymnasts at the 1924 Summer Olympics
Sportspeople from Turku
20th-century Finnish people